Kumhali, Kumali, or Kumbale, is an Indo-Aryan language spoken by some of the Kumal people of Nepal. It has  speakers, out of an ethnic population of 121,000.

References

Indo-Aryan languages
Languages of Nepal